Timeless: The Classics is a 1992 album of cover versions by Michael Bolton. It was #1 on the Billboard charts when it was released. After a rather long chart run, the album has been certified 4× Platinum in the US and has sold over 7 million copies worldwide.

Track listing

Production 
 Producers – Michael Bolton (all tracks); David Foster (Tracks 1, 2, 4, 5, 7 & 10); Walter Afanasieff (Tracks 3, 6, 8 & 9).
 Engineers – Dave Reitzas and Bill Schnee (Tracks 1, 2, 4, 5 & 7); Dana Jon Chappelle (Tracks 3, 6, 8 & 9); Al Schmitt (Track 10).
 Vocal Engineer (Tracks 1, 2, 4, 5, 7 & 10) – Dave Reitzas
 Orchestra Engineer (Tracks 1, 2, 4, 5 & 7) – Al Schmitt
 Additional and Assistant Engineers (Tracks 1, 2, 4, 5, 7 & 10) – Kyle Bess, Craig Brock, Chris Fogel, Steve Harrison, Noel Hazen, Steve Milo, Marnie Riley, Eric Rudd, Brian Scheuble and Brett Swain.
 Second Engineers (Tracks 3, 6, 8 & 9) – Kyle Bess, Mark Hensley, Manny LaCarubba and Eric Rudd.
 Mixing – Al Schmitt (Tracks 1, 5, 7 & 10); Mick Guzauski (Tracks 2 & 4); Dana Jon Chappelle (Tracks 3, 6, 8 & 9).
 Mastered by Vlado Meller at Sony Music Studio Operations (New York, NY).

Additional Credits
 Art Direction and Design – Christopher Austopchuk
 Photography – Matthew Rolston
 Management – Louis Levin and Jill Tiger
 Grooming – Nancy Sprague 
 Styling – Gemina Aboitiz

Personnel 
 Michael Bolton – lead vocals, arrangements (1, 2, 4, 5, 7, 10), rhythm arrangements (1, 2, 5, 7), backing vocals (6)
 David Foster – arrangements (1, 2, 4, 5, 7, 10), rhythm arrangements (1, 2, 5, 7), additional keyboards (2, 5)
 Randy Kerber – acoustic piano (1, 2, 4, 5, 8), Hammond B3 organ (6), organ (7), electric piano (10)
 Greg Phillinganes – organ (2), acoustic piano (7)
 Robbie Buchanan – additional keyboards (2, 5)
 Walter Afanasieff – keyboards (3, 9), synthesizers (3, 9), Hammond B3 organ (3, 8, 9), bass (3, 9), rhythm programming (3, 9), acoustic piano (6), horn arrangements (6, 8)
 Gary Cirimelli – Akai programming (3), Macintosh programming (3, 6, 8, 9), Synclavier programming (3, 9), additional backing vocals (9)
 Ren Klyce – Synclavier programming (3, 9), Akai programming (3, 9)
 Ian Underwood – acoustic piano (10)
 Dean Parks – acoustic guitar (1, 5)
 Michael Thompson – electric guitar (1, 2, 4, 5, 7), guitar (6, 8)
 Vernon "Ice" Black – guitar (3)
 Michael Landau – additional guitar (6, 8), guitar (9)
 Neil Stubenhaus – bass (1, 4, 5, 8)
 Nathan East – bass (2, 7)
 Randy Jackson – bass (6)
 John Robinson – drums (1, 2, 4–8)
 Joel Peskin – saxophone solo (4)
 Portia Griffin – backing vocals (2, 7, 8), additional backing vocals (3, 9)
 Pat Hawk – backing vocals (2, 7, 8), additional backing vocals (3, 9)
 Vann Johnson – backing vocals (2, 7, 8), additional backing vocals (3, 9)
 Janis Liebhart – backing vocals (2, 7, 8), additional backing vocals (3, 9)
 Carmen Twillie – backing vocals (2, 7), additional backing vocals (3)
 Mona Lisa Young – backing vocals (2, 7, 8), additional backing vocals (3, 9)
 The Four Tops – backing vocals (3)
 Yvonne Williams – backing vocals (8), additional backing vocals (9)
 Claytoven Richardson – additional backing vocals (9)
 The PH1 Choir – backing vocals (9)
 Patrick Henderson – choir director and vocal arrangements (9)

Tower Of Power Horn Section (Tracks 6 & 8)
 Stephen "Doc" Kupka – baritone saxophone 
 Emilio Castillo – tenor saxophone 
 Gary Herbig – tenor saxophone
 Lee Thornburg – trombone, trumpet 
 Greg Adams – trumpet, horn arrangements

Orchestra (Tracks 1, 2, 4, 5, 7 & 10)
 Johnny Mandel – orchestra arrangements and conductor (1, 5, 7, 10)
 Jeremy Lubbock – orchestra arrangements and conductor (2)
 David Foster – string arrangements (4)
 Gerald Vinci – concertmaster 
 Debbie Datz-Pyle – contractor 
 Patti Zimmitti – contractor
 Jim Atkinson, Jeff DeRosa, Brian O'Connor, Calvin Smith, Richard Todd and Brad Warnaar – French horn
 Donald Ashworth, Jon Clarke, Gary Foster, Glen Garrett, Dan Higgins, Marty Kristall, Jack Nimitz and Bob Sheppard – woodwinds 
 Larry Bunker – percussion 
 Chuck Domanico, Edward Meares, Buell Neidlinger and Margaret Storer – bass 
 Robert Adcock, Jodi Burnett, Larry Corbett, Ronald Cooper, Christine Ermacoff, Marie Fera, Paula Hochholter, Judy Johnson, Anne Karam, Suzie Katayama, Dane Little, Frederick Seykora, Christina Soule and David Speltz – cello 
 Gayle Levant – harp
 Denyse Buffum, Brian Dembow, Alan DeVeritch, Roland Kato, Donald McInnis, Cynthia Morrow, Carole Mukogawa, Dan Neufeld, Kazi Pitelka, Harry Shirinian, Linn Subotnick, Ray Tischer and Mihail Zinovyev – viola 
 Dixie Blackstone, Mari Botnick, Robert Brousseau, Russ Cantor, Isabelle Daskoff, Assa Drori, Henry Ferber, Ronald Folsom, Armen Garabedian, Berj Garabedian, Harris Goldman, Gwen Heller, Reginald Hill, Bill Hybel, Lisa Johnson, Karen Jones, Kathleen Lenski, Norma Leonard, Rene Mandel, Michael Markman, Betty Moor, Irma Neumann, Donald Palmer, Claudia Parducci, Sheldon Sanov, Haim Shtrum, Robert Sushel, Gerald Vinci and Dorothy Wade – violin

Charts

Weekly charts

Year-end charts

Certifications

References

Michael Bolton albums
1992 albums
Covers albums
Columbia Records albums